KDOM-FM (94.3 FM) is a radio station broadcasting a country music format licensed to Windom, Minnesota, United States. The station is currently owned by Steve and Laura White, through licensee Next Step Broadcasting, Inc.

References

External links

Radio stations in Minnesota
Country radio stations in the United States
Cottonwood County, Minnesota
Radio stations established in 1961
1961 establishments in Minnesota
Windom, Minnesota